Lepidogma obatralis is a species of snout moth in the genus Lepidogma. It was described by Hugo Theodor Christoph in 1877 and is known from Turkmenistan (including the type location Krasnowodsk).

References

Moths described in 1877
Epipaschiinae